Aprimo (/æ,primo/) is a United States-based company that develops and sells marketing automation software and digital asset management (DAM) technology for marketing and customer experience departments in enterprise organizations. Its software is designed to help manage the behind-the-scenes activities involved in marketing.

History

Early History
Aprimo was founded in Indianapolis in 1998 by former executives of Software Artistry, which had recently been purchased by IBM.    There are suggestions it was the first supplier of Marketing resource management (MRM) software, it is certainly the case that it was one of the earliest providers.  In 2004, it made its first acquisition, buying British software developer Then. The following year, 2005, saw Aprimo acquire the EMS business of DoubleClick together with about 70 customers before the remainder of that organisation went to Hellman & Friedman. By 2007, Aprimo had about 250 employees and its clients included Bank of America, Nestlé, Warner Bros., and Toyota.

Teradata
In 2011 the company was acquired by Teradata in a $525 million transaction.

Marlin
Teradata sold Aprimo in 2016 to Marlin Equity Partners for $90 million which merged it with Revenew and relocated its headquarters to Chicago.  In 2017, Aprimo acquired Belgian company ADAM Software.

Products and services
The company's products include Digital Asset Management, software for managing videos, images, documents, and other assets; Productivity Management, software for managing ideas, plans, and production workflows; Plan & Spend, a budget planning system; Distributed Marketing, which coordinates marketing activities; and Campaign, a system that offers automated marketing data segmentation.

In 2017, according to the company, it moved its products to SaaS-based systems running on the Microsoft Azure cloud computing service.

Operations
Aprimo is headquartered in Chicago, with R&D and customer service operations primarily based in Indianapolis.

References

External links
 

1998 establishments in Indiana
Companies based in Chicago
Software companies established in 1998
American companies established in 1998
Privately held companies based in Illinois